Scotch Dyke railway station was a railway station in Cumberland close to the Scots' Dike, the traditional border with Scotland.

History 
The station was opened on 25 October 1861 by the Border Union Railway as 'Scotsdyke' and later renamed 'Scotch Dyke'. It was a two-platform station with a level crossing to its north.

The station closed on 2 May 1949. The line was closed to all traffic by British Railways on 5 January 1969, and dismantled in 1971, see Border Union Railway.

Today (2006) the former station retains its building and platforms. The canopy of the building has a script reading "Speed and comfort by rail".

References 

Disused railway stations in Cumbria
Former Border Union Railway stations
Railway stations in Great Britain opened in 1861
Railway stations in Great Britain closed in 1949
1861 establishments in England